The 1970 All-Pacific-8 Conference football team consists of American football players chosen by various organizations for All-Pacific-8 Conference teams for the 1970 NCAA University Division football season.

Offensive selections

Quarterbacks
 Jim Plunkett, Stanford (AP-1; UPI-1) (1970 Heisman Trophy winner)
 Dennis Dummit, UCLA (UPI-2)

Running backs
 Bobby Moore, (later Ahmad Rashad), Oregon (AP-1; UPI-1)
 Randy Vataha, Stanford (AP-1; UPI-1)
 Clarence Davis, USC (AP-1; UPI-2)
 Dave Schilling, Oregon State (UPI-1)
 Bob Ewen, Washington State (UPI-2)
 Bo Cornell, Washington (UPI-2)

Ends/receivers
 Bob Moore, Stanford (AP-1 [tight end]; UPI-1 [end])
 Bob Newland, Oregon (AP-1 [end]; UPI-1 [end])
 Jim Krieg, Washington (UPI-2)
 Bobby Chandler, USC (UPI-2)

Tackles
 Steve Jubb, Stanford (AP-1; UPI-1)
 Bob Richards, California (AP-1; UPI-1)
 Mary Montgomery, USC (UPI-2)
 Tom Shellabarger, San Diego State (UPI-2)

Guards
 Steve Busch, Washington State (AP-1; UPI-1)
 Ernie Janet, Washington (AP-1; UPI-1)
 Jack Stambaugh, Oregon (UPI-2)
 Greg Hendren, California (UPI-2)

Centers
 Dave Dalby, UCLA (AP-1)
 John Sande, Stanford (UPI-1)
 Bruce Jarvis, Washington (UPI-2)

Defensive selections

Ends
 Charlie Weaver, USC (AP-1; UPI-1)
 Jim Sherbert, Oregon State (AP-1; UPI-1)
 Steve Buettner, Oregon (UPI-2)
 Pete Lazetich, Stanford (UPI-2)

Tackles
 Craig Hanneman, Oregon State (AP-1 [lineman]; UPI-1)
 Dave Tipton, Stanford (AP-1 [lineman]; UPI-1 [linebacker])
 Tom Falla, Washington (AP-1 [lineman]; UPI-2)
 Tim Osterling, UCLA (UPI-1)
 D. Z. White, California (UPI-2)

Linebackers
 Sherm White, California (AP-1 [lineman]; UPI-1)
 Jeff Siemon, Stanford (AP-1; UPI-2)
 Tom Graham, Oregon (AP-1; UPI-2)
 Dave Chaney, San Jose State (UPI-1)
 Phil Croyle, California (AP-1)
 Bob Pifferini, USC (UPI-2)

Defensive backs
 Cal Jones, Washington (AP-1; UPI-1)
 Ray Youngblood, California (AP-1; UPI-1)
 Lionel Coleman, Oregon (AP-1; UPI-2)
 Jack Schultz, Stanford (UPI-2)
 Jim Lilly, Oregon State (UPI-1)
 Bill Cahill, Washington (UPI-2)
 Ron Carver, UCLA (UPI-2)

Key

AP = Associated Press, selected by the conference head coaches

UPI = United Press International, selected by UPI from all teams on the Pacific Coast, not limited to the Pac-8 Conference

See also
1970 College Football All-America Team

References

All-Pacific-8 Conference Football Team
All-Pac-12 Conference football teams